Miguel Ángel Onzari (born March 23, 1951 in Buenos Aires, Argentina) is a former Argentine footballer who played in clubs of Argentina, Chile and Ecuador.

Teams
  Vélez Sársfield 1971
  Colo Colo 1972
  Vélez Sársfield 1973–1974
  Chacarita Juniors 1975–1977
  Manta 1978
  Emelec 1979–1982

Titles
  Colo Colo 1972 (Chilean League)

References
 Profile at BDFA 

1951 births
Living people
Argentine footballers
Argentine expatriate footballers
Club Atlético Vélez Sarsfield footballers
Chacarita Juniors footballers
C.S. Emelec footballers
Colo-Colo footballers
Expatriate footballers in Chile
Expatriate footballers in Ecuador
Association footballers not categorized by position
Footballers from Buenos Aires